Diego Nicolás de la Cruz Arcosa (born 1 June 1997) is a Uruguayan professional footballer who plays as an attacking midfielder for Argentine club River Plate and the Uruguay national team.

International career
De la Cruz began his international career for Uruguay with under-17 team. He was captain of Uruguay under-20 team which won 2017 South American U-20 Championship and reached semi-finals of 2017 FIFA U-20 World Cup.

On 18 September 2020, de la Cruz was included in Uruguay's 26-men preliminary squad for World Cup qualifying matches against Chile and Ecuador. He was later included in the final squad and made his senior debut on 8 October 2020 in Uruguay's 2–1 win against Chile. He started the match and played 55 minutes before getting replaced by Nahitan Nández.

Personal life
De la Cruz is the half-brother of former Uruguayan international footballer Carlos Sánchez. Their nephew Facundo Trinidad is also a professional footballer. All three of them are youth academy graduates of Liverpool Montevideo.

In 2022 he obtained Argentine citizenship.

Career statistics

International

Scores and results list Uruguay's goal tally first, score column indicates score after each de la Cruz goal.

Honours
River Plate
Copa Argentina: 2017
Supercopa Argentina: 2018
Copa Libertadores: 2018
Recopa Sudamericana: 2019

References

External links

 

1997 births
Living people
Uruguayan footballers
Uruguay under-20 international footballers
Uruguay international footballers
Liverpool F.C. (Montevideo) players
Club Atlético River Plate footballers
Uruguayan Primera División players
Argentine Primera División players
Uruguayan expatriate footballers
Expatriate footballers in Argentina
Footballers from Montevideo
Association football forwards
2021 Copa América players
2022 FIFA World Cup players